Lee Kil-yong is a Korean name consisting of the family name Lee and the given name Kil-yong. It may refer to:

 Lee Kil-yong (footballer, born 1959)
 Lee Kil-yong (footballer, born 1976)